Roland Szolnoki (born 21 January 1992) is a Hungarian football player who plays as a right back for Puskás Akadémia FC and Hungary national team. A versatile international footballer, he can play with both feet. He normally plays as a defender, but he can sometimes play as a deep-lying playmaker.

He started his football career with Videoton and scored his first senior goal against Kecskemét, on 26 May 2013.

Club career
In his first season, he played in the first team only in a Hungarian Cup match. The first was played in August 2009 by BFC against Siofok.

Prior to the 2011–12 season, on 7 July, he extended his contract with Videoton for another three years. In the qualifying round of the 2011-12 Champions League, he was nominated as a substitute for the sturm Graz, but he did not enter the field. In the championship, Paulo Sousa head coached the Paks FC in the 85th minute between adults. Then they were counted on the second team again. He gave Barnabás Babos a scorer for Győr II. Eight months later, after entering the first adult championship, he was back on track in the first team against Kaposvár as a beginner. During the season, he got more and more opportunities. The season ended with 13 NB 1 matches.

In the 2012–13 season in the European League qualifier, the first match against Slovan Bratislava was still on the bench, but on the retrograde he was already on the pitch. KAA was also a beginner against Gent, but on the retreat only Sousa was on the bench. In the first round of the championship, he was just a beginner in the domestic match against Lombard Pope. However, it was replaced in the midst of the match. He collected his second yellow card against Újpest FC, so the judge issued it. By downloading his disqualification, he returned to Szombathely's Progress, but he could not be long since he was fouled at 76 minutes and re-issued.

In summer 2018, he signed a two-year contract with Puskas Akademia FC.

International career
Szolnoki previously represented for various youth squads for the Hungary. He was called to national team by Pál Dárdai. Szolnoki made his first senior international debut in June 2015 against Lithuania and played all 90 minutes. Hungary win the match 4–0.

Club statistics

External links
 Profile 

1992 births
Living people
People from Mór
Hungarian footballers
Association football defenders
Fehérvár FC players
Puskás Akadémia FC players
Nemzeti Bajnokság I players
Hungary youth international footballers
Hungary under-21 international footballers
Hungary international footballers
Sportspeople from Fejér County